Eigel is a surname. Notable people with the surname include:

Bill Eigel, American politician
Hanna Eigel (born 1939), Austrian figure skater
Pavel Eigel (born 1990), Russian slalom canoeist

See also
Engel (surname)
Veigel
Weigel